Olli-Pekka Laine is a Finnish musician, currently as a bassist in Finnish metal bands Amorphis (1990-2000, 2017-) and Barren Earth (2008-). He was also formerly in other Finnish metal bands, 
Nuxvomica (1990), Rytmihäiriö (1991-1992), Mannhai (2001-2006, 2016), Chaosbreed (2003-2005) & Kiljuvelka-70.

Discography

Amorphis
Disment of Soul (1991)	Untitled Amorphis Single (1991)	The Karelian Isthmus (1992)Privilege of Evil (1993)	Tales from the Thousand Lakes (1994)Black Winter Day (1994)	Elegy (1996)My Kantele (1997)Tuonela (1999)Divinity / Northern Lights (1999)Story - 10th Anniversary (2000)Chapters (2003)Relapse Singles Series Vol. 4 (2004)	His Story - Best Of (2016)Queen of Time (2018)Halo (2022)

Barren EarthCurse of the Red River (2010)The Devil's Resolve (2012)On Lonely Towers (2015)	A Complex Of Cages'' (2018)

References

Living people
21st-century Finnish male singers
Finnish heavy metal bass guitarists
Death metal musicians
1973 births
Male bass guitarists
20th-century Finnish male singers
21st-century bass guitarists